The Wind in the Willows is a 2006 live-action television adaptation of Kenneth Grahame's classic 1908 novel The Wind in the Willows. It was a joint production of the BBC and the Canadian Broadcasting Corporation and starred Matt Lucas (Mr. Toad), Bob Hoskins (Badger), Mark Gatiss (Ratty), and Lee Ingleby (Mole), with a cameo appearance from Michael Murphy as the Judge. Rachel Talalay directed. It debuted in Canada on CBC Television on 18 December 2006 in the United Kingdom on BBC1 on 1 January 2007, in the U.S. on PBS's Masterpiece Theatre on 8 April 2007 and in Australia on ABC TV on 23 December 2007. It was filmed on location in Bucharest, Romania.

Though the novel is considered children's literature, critics noted that this adaptation might not be appropriate for young children; Ginia Bellafante wrote in The New York Times that it "is ultimately too jaunty to be considered 100 percent safe for someone over 10", and David Knox thought it "may well alienate children". However, Variety's Brian Lowry said that its appeal "should run the demographic gamut for PBS, from Sesame Street to Bleak House."

Reception

Critics praised Matt Lucas's portrayal of Mr. Toad. "In ordinary life Mr. Lucas’s frame does not suggest that he is a salad-and-pea-shoots kind of guy, and here he has fun with an exaggerated corpulence that seems to leave him channeling W. C. Fields," wrote Bellafante. David Knox wrote that "Lucas’ performance positively swamps this treatment of the classic story".

Director Rachel Talalay received the 2007 Leo Award for "Best Direction in a Youth or Children's Program or Series" for the film. It was also nominated for the 2007 Satellite Award for "Best Motion Picture Made for Television"

References

External links
 
 Review at Eye for Film

2006 television films
2006 films
British children's films
British television films
Films directed by Rachel Talalay
Films based on The Wind in the Willows
2000s children's films
Films with screenplays by Lee Hall (playwright)
Television shows based on The Wind in the Willows
2000s British films